Lahure may refer to:

People
 Laure (Nepalese rapper)

People with the surname
Johny Lahure (1942-2003), a Luxembourgian politician
Louis Joseph Lahure (1767-1853), a Dutch-French general
Petz Lahure (born 1945), Luxembourgian sports journalist.

Film
Lahure (film), a 1989 Nepali film